Alexa Citlali Moreno Medina (born 8 August 1994) is a Mexican artistic gymnast. She is the 2018 World bronze medalist on vault, the first Mexican female gymnast to medal at the World Artistic Gymnastics Championships. She represented Mexico at the 2016 Summer Olympics where she was the second reserve for the all-around final and at the 2020 Olympics where she placed fourth in the vault final. She won a silver medal on vault at the 2010 Central American and Caribbean Games and a bronze medal on vault at the 2010 Pacific Rim Championships. She is also a five-time medalist on the FIG World Cup circuit. She is the 2011 Pan American Games and 2014 and 2018 Pan American Championships team bronze medalist and the 2010 and 2014 Central American and Caribbean Games team gold medalist.

Career 
Moreno began gymnastics when she was three years old.

Moreno won the bronze medal on the vault at the 2010 Pacific Rim Championships behind Dominique Pegg and Emily Little. Then at the Central American and Caribbean Games, she won the team gold medal and also won the vault silver medal behind teammate Elsa García. The Mexican team finished twenty-first during the qualification round for the 2010 World Championships.

Moreno did not compete at the 2011 Pan American Games due to a meniscus injury the day before the competition began, but she still received the bronze medal the Mexican team won. Then at the World Championships, the Mexican team finished seventeenth in the qualification round, and Moreno qualified for the vault final where she finished seventh.

At the 2012 Zibo World Challenge Cup, Moreno won the silver medal on the vault behind Cheng Fei. Then at the Ghent World Challenge Cup, she won her first FIG World Cup gold medal on the vault.

Moreno finished fourth with the Mexican team at the 2013 Universiade, and she placed fifth in the vault final.

Moreno won a bronze medal with the Mexican team at the 2014 Pan American Championships. She also placed sixth in the all-around, seventh in the vault, and fifth in the uneven bars. At the 2014 World Championships in Nanning, China, she helped the Mexican team place fourteenth with qualified the team for the 2015 World Championships. She qualified for the vault final and placed seventh. Then at the Central American and Caribbean Games, she won the gold medal with the Mexican team and also placed ninth in the all-around and eighth in the uneven bars.

Moreno won the bronze medal in the all-around at the 2015 Mexican Championships. She also won the all-around bronze medal at the Olimpiada Nacional. Then at the Anadia World Challenge Cup, she won the silver medal on the vault behind Marcia Videaux. She missed the 2015 Pan American Games due to a broken cheekbone. She returned to competition at the World Championships and finished seventh in the vault final. After the World Championships, she finished seventh in the all-around at the Arthur Gander Memorial. Then at the Swiss Cup, she competed on a mixed-team with Daniel Corral, and they finished eighth.

Moreno qualified for the 2016 Olympic Games at the Olympic Test Event where she finished twenty-second in the all-around. She then won the silver medal on the vault at the Anadia World Challenge Cup behind Marcia Videaux. She represented Mexico at the 2016 Summer Olympics and finished thirty-first in the all-around during the qualification round, making her the second reserve for the all-around final.

Moreno did not compete in 2017 to focus on her studies.

Moreno won the all-around bronze medal at the 2018 Mexican Championships and won the vault title. Then at the Mexican Trial Meet, she won the silver medal in the all-around behind Frida Esparza. She won the team bronze medal at the Pan American Championships and also placed fourth in the all-around. She won the vault bronze medal at the 2018 World Championships in Doha behind Simone Biles and Shallon Olsen and became the first Mexican female gymnast to win a medal at the World Artistic Gymnastics Championships. She was only the second Mexican gymnast to win a World medal after Daniel Corral won a silver medal on the pommel horse in 2013. After the World Championships, she competed at the Cottbus World Cup and finished fourth on the vault. Additionally, the Mexican team placed nineteenth in the qualification round. She then competed at the Toyota International and won the gold medal on the vault and placed eighth on the floor exercise.

Moreno finished fourth on the vault at the 2019 Melbourne World Cup. She then won the bronze medal on the vault at the Baku World Cup behind Jade Carey and Oksana Chusovitina. She once again placed fourth on the vault at the Doha World Cup. At the Mexican Championships, she won the vault title and placed seventh in the all-around. Then at the Korea Cup, she won the bronze medal on the vault behind Yeo Seo-jeong and Oksana Chusovitina. At the 2019 World Championships in Stuttgart, she finished sixth in the vault final and qualified for the 2020 Olympics with her fortieth-place all-around finish in the qualification round.

Moreno represented Mexico at the 2020 Summer Olympics and became only the second Mexican female gymnast to qualify for a final after Denisse López qualified for the vault final at the 2000 Olympic Games. She finished fourth in the vault final by less than one-tenth behind bronze medalist Yeo Seo-jeong. She announced her retirement after the Olympics.

In March of 2023, Moreno announced that she has returned to training and intends to attend the 2023 Pan American Gymnastics Championships in Medellín, Colombia.

Awards 
In November 2019, Moreno won the Premio Nacional de Deportes 2019 (National Sports Prize 2019) in the "non-professional" category. Also in 2019, she won the Woman of the Year poll in the El Financiero newspaper and was recognized as one of the 100 most powerful women in Mexico by Forbes Mexico magazine.

Sponsorships 
Moreno starred in a Toyota commercial during the 2020 Tokyo Olympics, and Toyota is one of her sponsors.

Personal life 
During the 2016 Olympics, Moreno was bullied and fat-shamed on social media. In December 2021, she graduated with a degree in Architecture from the University of the Valley of Mexico, Mexicali campus. She admires Mexican Taekwondo athlete María Espinoza.

Competitive history

References

External links
 
 

Living people
Mexican female artistic gymnasts
1994 births
Sportspeople from Mexicali
Gymnasts at the 2011 Pan American Games
Pan American Games bronze medalists for Mexico
Gymnasts at the 2016 Summer Olympics
Olympic gymnasts of Mexico
Medalists at the World Artistic Gymnastics Championships
Pan American Games medalists in gymnastics
Central American and Caribbean Games gold medalists for Mexico
Central American and Caribbean Games silver medalists for Mexico
Competitors at the 2010 Central American and Caribbean Games
Competitors at the 2014 Central American and Caribbean Games
Central American and Caribbean Games medalists in gymnastics
Medalists at the 2011 Pan American Games
Gymnasts at the 2020 Summer Olympics
21st-century Mexican women